The 2021 Herr's Potato Chips 200 was the fifth stock car race of the 2021 ARCA Menards Series season and the first race of the 2021 Sioux Chief Showdown. The race was held on Saturday, May 22, 2021, in Toledo, Ohio, at Toledo Speedway, a  permanent oval-shaped racetrack. The race took the scheduled 200 laps to complete. At race's end, Ty Gibbs of Joe Gibbs Racing would dominate the race and win his 11th career ARCA Menards Series win, his third of the season, and his second straight win. To fill out the podium, Corey Heim of Venturini Motorsports and Nick Sanchez of Rev Racing would finish second and third, respectively.

Background 
Toledo Speedway opened in 1960 and was paved in 1964. In 1978 it was sold to Thomas "Sonny" Adams Sr. The speedway was reacquired by ARCA in 1999. The track also features the weekly racing divisions of sportsman on the half-mile and Figure 8, factory stock, and four cylinders on a quarter-mile track inside the big track. They also have a series of races with outlaw-bodied late models that includes four 100-lap races and ends with Glass City 200. The track hosts the “Fastest short track show in the world” which features winged sprints and winged Super Modifieds on the half mile. Toledo also used to host a 200-lap late model race until its sale to ARCA in 1999.

Toledo is known for the foam blocks that line the race track, different than the concrete walls that line many short tracks throughout America. The crumbling walls can make track cleanup a tedious task for workers.

Entry list

Practice

First and final practice 
The only practice session would take place on Saturday, May 22, at 4:15 PM EST.

Qualifying 
Qualifying would take place on Saturday, May 22, at 6:00 PM EST.

Race results

References 

2021 ARCA Menards Series
Herr's Potato Chips 200
Herr's Potato Chips 200